Minuscule 827 (in the Gregory-Aland numbering), ε309 (von Soden), is a 13th-century Greek minuscule manuscript of the New Testament on parchment.

Description 
The codex contains the text of the four Gospels, on 225 parchment leaves (size ), with one lacuna at the end. The text is written in one column per page, 24 lines per page.
The text of John 19:21–21:25 was supplied by a later hand.

The Ammonian Sections are given without a references to the Eusebian Canons (written under Ammonian Sections).

It contains subscriptions at the end of each Gospel and versification. There are blank spaces for pictures.

Text 
The Greek text of the codex is a representative of the Byzantine text-type. Hermann von Soden classified it to the textual family Iφb. Aland did not place it in any Category.
According to Aland it belongs to the textual family 1424.

According to the Claremont Profile Method it represents textual cluster 827 in Luke 1, Luke 10, and Luke 20. It is a perfect member of the family.
The cluster has following profile:
 Luke 1: (4), 5, (6), 9, 28, 33, 34, (36), 37, 53.
 Luke 10: 15, 19, 48, 51, 55, 57, 58, 62.
 Luke 20: 1, (9), 21, 33, 42, 43, 48, 55, 65, 74.

The cluster 827 consisting of manuscripts 827, 1050, 1446, 1457, 1593, and 2766. Minuscule 827 is the lead manuscript of the cluster.

It lacks the text of the Pericope Adulterae (John 7:53-8:11).

History 

Gregory dated the manuscript to the 13th century, other palaeographers dated it to the 11th century. Currently the manuscript is dated by the INTF to the 13th century.

The manuscript was examined and described by Antonio Rocci in 1882. The manuscript was collated by F. G. Carver in 1958.

It was added to the list of New Testament manuscripts by Scrivener (625) and Gregory (827e). Gregory saw it in 1886.

Currently the manuscript is housed at the Biblioteca della Badia (A' α. 4), in Grottaferrata.

See also 

 List of New Testament minuscules
 Biblical manuscript
 Textual criticism
 Minuscule 825

References

Further reading 

 
 Antonio Rocci, Codices cryptenses, seu Abbatiae Cryptae Ferratae in Tusculano digesti et illustrati (Tusculanum 1883).

Greek New Testament minuscules
13th-century biblical manuscripts